Sanjay Goradia is an Indian actor, director and producer. He has produced more than hundred Gujarati plays and acted in quarter of them. He has acted in several Hindi and Gujarati films and has produced television shows.

Biography 
Sanjay Goradia started his theatre career on backstage in 1979 for Pagla Ghoda, a play directed by Latesh Shah.

Some of his well known plays include Pappu Paas Thayi Gayo, Aa Namo Bahu Nade Chhe, Chup Raho Khush Raho, De Taali Kona Baap Ni Diwali, Sunder Be Baydiwalo and Bairaono Bahubali. He produced several Hindi plays including Maa Retire Hoti Hai starring Jaya Bachchan, Pati-Patni aur Mein starring Shatrughan Sinha, Chupkay Chupkay starring Zeenat Aman and Lali Leela.

He produced several Gujarati television shows including Tari Ankhno Afini, Aa Family Comedy Che (2014), Kumkum Na Pagla Padya (2015), Shukra Mangal and Sukh Mare Angane which were aired on for Colors Gujarati as well as Marathi television shows Madhu Ithe An Chandra Tithe (2011) and Azunahi Chaand Raat Ahe (2012) on Zee Marathi.

Theatre

Television

Television (As a Producer) 
“Madhu Ithe An Chandra Tithe” 
“Azunahi Chaand Raat Ahe on Zee Marathi”
“Tari ankh No Afini” 
“Aa Family Comedy Che”
“Kumkum Na Pagla Padya”
“Sukh Mare Angane on Colors Gujarati”

Television (As a Actor) 
“Shrimaan Shrimati (TV Series)”
“Filmi Chakker”
“Teri Bi Chup Meri Bi Chup”
“Kabhi Yeh Kabhi Woh”
“Naya Nukkad”
“Hum Paanch”
“Nirma Ahaa”
“Bhago Dukh Aaya”
“Papad Pol – Shahabuddin Rathod Ki Rangeen Duniya”
“Maniben.com”
“Thodi Khushi Thode Gham”
“Partners”

Filmography 
Goradia has acted in several Hindi and Gujarati films.

 Ram Lakhan (Hindi, 1989)
 Khal Nayak (Hindi, 1993)
 Rangeela (Hindi, 1995)
 Is Raat Ki Subah Nahin (Hindi, 1996)
 Ishq (Hindi, 1997)
 Mann (Hindi, 1999)
 Safari (Hindi, 1999)
 Khoobsurat (Hindi, 1999)
 Kachche Dhaage (Hindi, 1999)
 Kahin Pyaar Na Ho Jaaye (Hindi, 2000)
 Ventilator (Gujarati, 2018)
 Made In China (Hindi, 2019) 
 Chhichhore (Hindi, 2019)
 Kehvatlal Parivar (Gujarati, 2022)
 Vhalam Jao Ne (Gujarati, upcoming)

References

External links
 

1959 births
Living people
Male actors in Gujarati-language films
Male actors from Mumbai
Indian theatre directors
Gujarati people
Indian male stage actors
20th-century Indian male actors
21st-century Indian male actors